The Puri Baidyanath Dham Express is an Express train belonging to East Coast Railway zone that runs between  and  in India. It is currently being operated with 18449/18450 train numbers on a weekly basis.

Background
This train is on the Ravana the demon king meditated hard, in order to invoke Lord Shiva. Shiva gave him one of the twelve Jyotirlingams to take back with him to Lanka, with the condition that if it were placed on the ground it would take root immediately. Varuna the God of water, entered Ravana's belly, and caused him to feel the need to relieve himself. Vishnu then came down in the form of a lad and volunteered to hold the Jyotirlingam as he relieved himself. But before Ravana could return, the young lad placed the Jyotirlingam on the ground to which it became rooted. A disappointed Ravana offered severe penances to Shiva here, and cut off nine of his heads as a part of his repentance. Shiva revived him and joined the heads to the body, like a Vaidya or a "physician", and hence, this Jyotirlingam goes by the name Vaidyanath.

Service

The 18449/Puri Baidyanathdham Express has an average speed of 48 km/hr and covers 932 km in 19h 35m. The 18450/Puri Baidyanathdham Express has an average speed of 51 km/hr and covers 932 km in 18h 15m.

Route and halts 

The important halts of the train are:

Coach composition

The train has standard LHB rakes with a max speed of 110 kmph. The train consists of 18 coaches:

 1 AC II Tier
 2 AC III Tier
 9 Sleeper coaches
 4 General Unreserved
 2 Seating cum Luggage Rake

Traction

Both trains are hauled by an Asansol Loco Shed-based WAG-5 electric locomotive from Puri to Patna.

Rake sharing
The train shares its rake with 22889/22890 Samudra Kanya Express and 12895/12896 Howrah–Puri Weekly Express.

Direction reversal

The train reverses its direction 1 times:

See also 

 Patna Junction railway station
 Puri railway station
 Samudra Kanya Express
 Howrah–Puri Express

Notes

References

External links 

 18449/Puri Baidyanathdham Express India Rail Info
 18450/Puri Baidyanathdham Express India Rail Info

Transport in Puri
Transport in Patna
Named passenger trains of India
Rail transport in Odisha
Rail transport in Jharkhand
Rail transport in West Bengal
Rail transport in Bihar
Express trains in India